Piya Basanti Re is an Indian television series that airs Monday through Saturday evenings on Sony Pal. It premiered on 1 September 2014. It is produced by Rashmi Sharma Telefilms Limited featuring Adaa Khan and Alan Kapoor as leads. The series concluded on 12 December 2014.

Plot
The story begins with Geeta Patel, who works as a maid for the wealthy Shah family. Gita has a beautiful, very intelligent, and a perfect "cinderella" of a daughter, Piya, who she works hard to send to college. Piya's father, Gita's husband, had died fighting for the army and that had left Geeta and her daughter impoverished. But, Piya keeps her head up, takes pride in her mother's work, and excels at college. Piya attends college with Kabir (Alan Kapoor), Aditi (Sunayana Fozdar), Akshay (Siddharth Shivpuri), and Ayesha (Rashmi Singh). Kabir is the son of Nita Shah and Mahesh Shah, the oldest son of Baa, the head of the Shah family. Mahesh's sister, Savita, who is Baa's daughter, is married to Jatin, and they are the parents of Aditi and Akshay.
The woman who had hired Geeta to work for the Shah family, Ganga, is actually Ayesha's mother. However, Ganga is not wealthy by any means, and Ayesha enjoys living large and pretending to be rich and so, Ganga never discloses that she is Ayesha's mother. One day, Piya's mother injures herself and is unable to work. Money being tight, Piya decides to work for the Shah family as their maid and simultaneously attends college. In college and at home, Piya's interactions with Kabir increase, who begins to fall for her. In addition, Akshay begins to fall for Ayesha, who is Aditi's best friend, and comes very close to figuring out her life is a lie many times. Eventually, Piya and Kabir marry, much to the disappointment of all of Kabir's family members. Despite all this, Baa supports Piya and assures Piya that she is welcome in the Shah family as more than just a maid. As the TV show description on YouTube puts it, "An alternate spin on the famous- Cinderella story, Piya Basanti Re is the journey of Pia from being a maid’s daughter to becoming the daughter-in-law of the very rich Gujarati household where her mother worked as a maid."

Cast

 Adaa Khan as Piya Kabir Shah
 Alan Kapoor as Kabir Mahesh Shah
 Dinesh Soni as Jatin
 Siddharth Shivpuri as Akshay
 Sunayana Fozdar as Aditi 
 Rashmi Singh as Ayesha
 Krishna Bharadwaj as Himesh
 Hemant Choudhary as Col Vijay
 Vipra Rawal as Savita
 Rasik Dave as Mahesh Shah
 Surbhi Zaveri Vyas as Neeta Mahesh Shah
 Rupa Divetia as Baa
 Jaya Ojha as Geeta Patel
 Sudha Chandran as Yamini Singh

References

Watch all episodes:
https://www.youtube.com/channel/SWk6iDddjPorM/videos?sort=da&view=8&flow=grid

Indian television soap operas
Serial drama television series
2014 Indian television series debuts
2014 Indian television series endings
Sony Pal original programming